Domitien Ndayizeye (born 2 May 1953) is a Burundian politician who was President of Burundi from 2003 to 2005. He succeeded Pierre Buyoya, as president on 30 April 2003, after serving as Buyoya's vice president for 18 months. Ndayizeye remained in office until succeeded by Pierre Nkurunziza on 26 August 2005.

Ndayizeye currently serves as head of the National Gathering for Change (RANAC).

In 1994 he was appointed director of the National Intelligence Service by President Cyprien Ntaryamira.

In 2004, Ndayizeye proposed a draft constitution to the parliament prior to it being put to the electorate in referendum later in the year. Relations with the Tutsi group were strained, reflected in their boycotting of the legislative session due to consider the proposal. Due to a lack of preparation, the ballot was postponed to late November 2004.

Burundi is still trying to emerge from a civil war that began in 1993 when several groups drawn from the large Hutu majority took up arms against a government and army then dominated by a Tutsi elite.

The interim government pledged to more equitably share power between the two main ethnic groups.

On 21 August 2006, Ndayizeye was arrested in Bujumbura in relation to his alleged role in a coup plot earlier in the year. The Senate lifted his immunity as Senator prior to his arrest. He denied the charges against him in court on December 19 and said that he had "never dreamed of organising a coup, in fact I had given up politics to do business and be with my family". On January 15, 2007, he was acquitted along with former vice president Alphonse-Marie Kadege and three other defendants; two others were sentenced to long prison terms.

During 2010 general elections, as his party representative, he ran for the presidential seat but decided to withdraw from the race together with all opposition parties, after they accused the ruling party of rigging previous councilors' elections.

After opposition politician Zedi Feruzi was killed during the 2015 Burundian unrest Ndayizeye and other opposition parties broke off talks with the government of President Pierre Nkurunziza.

References 

1953 births
Living people
People from Kayanza Province
Hutu people
Front for Democracy in Burundi politicians
Presidents of Burundi
Burundian life senators
Vice-presidents of Burundi